Exatecan is a drug which is a structural analog of camptothecin with antineoplastic activity.

A derivative is used in Trastuzumab deruxtecan.

Synthesis

References

Topoisomerase inhibitors
Amines
Tertiary alcohols
Delta-lactones
Lactams
Fluoroarenes